The 1993–94 Nationalliga A season was the 56th season of the Nationalliga A, the top level of ice hockey in Switzerland. 10 teams participated in the league, and EHC Kloten won the championship.

Regular season

Playoffs

Quarterfinals

HC Fribourg-Gottéron - Zürcher SC 3:0 
Game 1: HCFG-ZSC  8:2 (1:1;3:0;4:1)
Game 2: ZSC-HCFG  5:6 (3:3;0:2;2:1)
Game 3: HCFG-ZSC 10:1 (4:0;4:0;2:1)

EV Zug - SC Bern 3:2 
Game 1: EVZ-SCB 4:3 (0:2;0:0;4:1)
Game 2: SCB-EVZ 5:0 (0:0;3:0;2:0)
Game 3: EVZ-SCB 4:2 (3:1;0:0;1:1)
Game 4: SCB-EVZ 8:0 (2:0;3:0;3:0)
Game 5: EVZ-SCB 2:1 n.V. (1:1;0:0;0:0;1:0)

HC Lugano - HC Ambrì-Piotta 3:2 
Game 1: HCL-HCAP 2:3 (1:3;1:0;0:0)
Game 2: HCAP-HCL 1:4 (1:1;0:1;0:2)
Game 3: HCL-HCAP 6:3 (3:1;1:1;2:1)
Game 4: HCAP-HCL 3:1 n.P. (0:0;1:1;0:0)
Game 5: HCL-HCAP 4:1 (2:0;1:1;1:0)

EHC Kloten - HC Davos 3:1 
Game 1: EHCK-HCD 2:3 (0:1;0:2;2:0)
Game 2: HCD-EHCK 0:5 (0:1;0:2;0:2)
Game 3: EHCK-HCD 7:1 (3:0;2:1;2:0)
Game 4: HCD-EHCK 4:5 (1:1;3:1;0:3)

Semifinals

HC Fribourg-Gottéron - EV Zug 3:1 
Game 1: HCFG-EVZ 7:5 (2:0;3:3;2:2)
Game 2: EVZ-HCFG 5:4
Game 3: HCFG-EVZ 9:3 (2:0;3:2;4:1)
Game 4: EVZ-HCFG 3:7 (0:1;2:2;1:4)

EHC Kloten - HC Lugano 3:1 
Game 1: EHCK-HCL 5:3 (3:1;0:1;2:1)
Game 2: HCL-EHCK 5:2 (2:0;2:1;1:1)
Game 3: EHCK-HCL 2:0 (0:0;1:0;1:0)
Game 4: HCL-EHCK 2:5 (1:1;0:1;1:3)

Final

HC Fribourg-Gottéron - EHC Kloten 1:3 
Game 1: HCFG-EHCK 4:5 (1:2;2:1;1:2)
Game 2: EHCK-HCFG 1:4 (0:1;1:0;0:3)
Game 3: HCFG-EHCK 2:4 (0:2;2:1;0:1)
Game 4: EHCK-HCFG 6:4 (1:2;1:2;4:0)

Relegation 
 EHC Olten - EHC Biel 2:3 on series

EHC Olten is relegated to the Nationalliga B.

External links
 Championnat de Suisse 1993/94

1993–94 in Swiss ice hockey
Swiss